Johan Ludvig Mansa (10 April 1740 – 13 April 1820), was a German-Danish landscape gardener. The majority of his work was in transforming formal French gardens into English landscape gardens. Some remnants of his works can still be seen on the slope north of Marienlyst Castle in Helsingør as well as a few manors and palaces around Denmark.

Personal life 
Johan Ludvig Mansa was born on 10 April 1740 in Zweibrücken, Germany, where his father was palace gardener. On 1 July 1772 he married Anne Christine Voigt. After the death of his first wife, Mansa married Louise Toxwærd (b. 31 December 1769 d. 23 March 1853) on 9 October 1791 with whom he had ten children: six sons and four daughters. Louise was the daughter of merchant Henrik Christian Toxwærd, owner of Louis grove on Falster and Anna Margrethe Hauen Dorff.

Career 
In 1765 he went to Denmark and was gardener at Fuglsang Manor, Lolland. In the 1780s, he was appointed as a gardener and steward of Marienlyst Castle in Helsingør, Denmark and in 1794 as a gardener at Frederiksborg Castle. Finally in 1799 he was employed as a gardener and steward at Fredensborg Palace.

He was the author of "Havekatekismus eller Grundregler for nyttige Havevæxters Dyrkning i Danmark" (Basic rules for growing of useful plants in Denmark) published in 1789 and won the Kgl Danske Landhusholdningsselskab prize. One of his other books "Gardening structures the English way" also contributed to his large influence on the development of gardening and horticulture in Denmark. He was greatly appreciated by King Frederik VI of Denmark who decorated him with the Order of the Dannebrog

References

Bibliography

External links 
  
 

1740 births
1820 deaths
German gardeners
German landscape architects
Danish gardeners
Danish landscape architects
Pomologists